Haughtoniana is an extinct genus of non-mammalian synapsid.

See also

 List of therapsids

References
 The main groups of non-mammalian synapsids at Mikko's Phylogeny Archive

Dicynodonts
Permian synapsids of Africa
Nomina dubia
Fossil taxa described in 1938
Taxa named by Lieuwe Dirk Boonstra